1982 Soviet Second League was a Soviet competition in the Soviet Second League.

Qualifying groups

Group I []

Group II []

Group III []

Group IV []

Group V (Soviet Republics)

Group VI [Ukraine]

Group VII (Central Asia)

Group VIII []

Group IX (Caucasus)

Final group stage
 [Oct 26 – Nov 19]

Group A

Group B

Group C

References
 All-Soviet Archive Site
 Results. RSSSF

Soviet Second League seasons
3
Soviet
Soviet